The Grammy Award for Best R&B Instrumental Performance was awarded from 1970 to 1990 and in 1993.  The award had several minor name changes:

From 1970 to 1985 the award was known as Best R&B Instrumental Performance
From 1986 to 1989 it was awarded as Best R&B Instrumental Performance (Orchestra, Group or Soloist)
In 1990 and 1993 it was awarded as Best R&B Instrumental Performance

Years reflect the year in which the Grammy Awards were presented, for works released in the previous year.

Recipients

References

Awards disestablished in 1993
Grammy Awards for rhythm and blues